Awais Dareshak is a Pakistani politician who has been a Member of the Provincial Assembly of Punjab since October 2018.

Political career
He was elected unopposed to the Provincial Assembly of Punjab as a candidate of Pakistan Tehreek-e-Insaf (PTI) from Constituency PP-296 (Rajanpur-IV) in by-election held in September 2018.

References

Living people
Punjab MPAs 2018–2023
Pakistan Tehreek-e-Insaf MPAs (Punjab)
Awais
Year of birth missing (living people)